Leptomycins are secondary metabolites produced by Streptomyces spp.

Leptomycin B (LMB) was originally discovered as a potent antifungal compound.  Leptomycin B was found to cause cell elongation of the fission yeast Schizosaccharomyces pombe. Since then this elongation effect has been used for the bioassay of leptomycin. However, recent data shows that leptomycin causes G1 cell cycle arrest in mammalian cells and is a potent anti-tumor agent against murine experimental tumors in combination therapy.

Leptomycin B has been shown to be a potent and specific nuclear export inhibitor in human and the fission yeast S. pombe. Leptomycin B alkylates and inhibits CRM1 (chromosomal region maintenance)/exportin 1, a protein required for nuclear export of proteins containing a nuclear export sequence (NES), by glycosylating a cysteine residue (cysteine 529 in S. pombe). In addition to antifungal and antibacterial activities, leptomycin B blocks the cell cycle and is a potent anti-tumor agent. At low nM concentrations, leptomycin B blocks the nuclear export of many proteins including HIV-1 Rev, MAPK/ERK, and NF-κB/IκB, and it inhibits the inactivation of p53. Leptomycin B also inhibits the export and translation of many RNAs, including COX-2 and c-Fos mRNAs, by inhibiting export of ribonucleoproteins.

Leptomycin A (LPA) was discovered together with LMB. LMB is twice as potent as LPA.

See also 
 Selective inhibitor of nuclear export

References

External links 
 

Original data copied with permission from Leptomycin B manufacturer product page (Fermentek)

Antibiotics